The 1977 All-Pacific-8 Conference football team consists of American football players chosen by various organizations for All-Pacific-8 Conference teams for the 1977 NCAA Division I football season.

Offensive selections

Quarterbacks
 Guy Benjamin, Stanford (1st)
 Jack Thompson, Washington State (2nd)

Running backs
 Charles White, USC (1st)
 Darrin Nelson, Stanford (1st)
 Joe Steele, Washington (2nd)
 Paul Jones, California (2nd)

Wide receivers
 James Lofton, Stanford (1st)
 Mike Levenseller, Washington State (1st)
 Jesse Thompson, California (2nd)
 Randy Simmrin, USC (2nd)

Tight ends
 George Freitas, California (1st)
 Bill Gay, USC (2nd)

Tackles
 Gordon King, Stanford (1st)
 Gus Coppens, UCLA (1st)
 Anthony Muñoz, USC (2nd)
 John Schuhmacher, USC (2nd)

Guards
 Pat Howell, USC (1st)
 Jeff Toews, Washington (1st)
 Duke Leffler, California (2nd)
 Mark Hill, Stanford (2nd)

Centers
 Blair Bush, Washington (1st)
 Jim Walker, Oregon State (2nd)

Defensive selections

Linemen
 Ralph DeLoach, California (1st)
 Manu Tuiasosopo, UCLA (1st)
 Walt Underwood, USC (1st)

Linebackers
 Gordy Ceresino, Stanford
 Michael Jackson, Washington (1st)
 Clay Matthews, Jr., USC (1st)
 Jerry Robinson, UCLA (1st)

Defensive backs
 Levi Armstrong, UCLA (1st)
 Ken Easley, UCLA (1st)
 Nesby Glasgow, Washington (1st)
 Ricky Odom, USC (1st)
 Dennis Thurman, USC (1st)

Special teams

Placekickers
 Jim Breech, California (1st)
 Frank Corral, UCLA (2nd)

Punters
 Gavin Hedrick, Washington State (1st)
 Dan Melville, California (2nd)

Key

See also
1977 College Football All-America Team

References

All-Pacific-8 Conference Football Team
All-Pac-12 Conference football teams